José Ortiz or Jose Ortiz may refer to:

Politics and law
José Casimiro Ortíz de la Renta (1760–1830), Puerto Rican politician; mayor of Ponce
José Ortiz de la Renta (1765–1850), Puerto Rican politician; mayor of Ponce
José Agustín Ortiz Pinchetti (born 1937), Mexican politician
José Ortiz Daliot (born 1945), Puerto Rican attorney and politician

Sports

Association football (soccer)
José María Ortiz de Mendíbil (1926–2015), Spanish football referee
José Ortiz (footballer, born 1977) (born 1977), Spanish football forward
José Luis Ortiz (born 1985), Bolivian football midfielder
Santos Ortíz (José Santos Ortiz Asencio, born 1990), Salvadoran footballer
José Guillermo Ortiz (born 1992), Costa Rican footballer
José Ortíz (footballer, born 1998) (born 1998), Colombian football defender

Other sports
José Ortiz (outfielder) (1947–2011), Puerto Rican baseball player
José Ortiz (basketball) (born 1963) Puerto Rican basketball player
José Ortiz (second baseman) (born 1977), Dominican baseball player
José Ortiz (runner) (fl. 1990s), Spanish paralympic athlete
José Ortiz (jockey) (born 1993), Puerto Rican horse racing jockey
José Ortiz (racewalker) (born 2000), Guatemalan racewalker

Others
José Damián Ortiz de Castro (1750–1793), Spanish architect
José Ortiz-Echagüe (1886–1980), Spanish entrepreneur, engineer, pilot and photographer
José Ortiz (comics) (1932–2013), Spanish comics artist
José Luis Ortiz Moreno (born 1967), Spanish astronomer

Other uses
José Leonardo Ortiz District, Peruvian geographical district